Parides photinus, the pink-spotted cattleheart, is a species of butterfly in the family Papilionidae. It was first described by Edward Doubleday in 1844.

Description
Parides photinus has a wingspan reaching . Adults are black with the hindwing having a blue-green metallic sheen, especially in the male. There are no wing bands. Two rows of red spots are found along the hindwing margin. The submarginal spots are strongly arched except for the upper two or three and the anal one; the latter is distinct on the upperside only in the female. The hindwings have short tails. The undersides are similar to the upsides. The larvae feed on Aristolochia grandiflora and A. asclepiadifolia. A full description is provided by Rothschild, W. and Jordan, K. (1906)

Distribution and habitat
This species can be found from Mexico to Costa Rica, in Nicaragua and in Honduras. It lives in forests, where it is common to abundant. Its range extends from the sea level to 5000 feet (1500 metres).

Gallery

Taxonomy
Parides photinus is a member of the ascanius species group
 ("Fringe-spots white. Hindwing with submarginal spots and unusually also discal spots or dots, or a discal band; mostly with tail").A quadrate whitish spot in space 2 of the forewings is quite peculiar of the ascanius group

The members are:
Parides agavus (Drury, 1782) – Agavus cattleheart
Parides alopius (Godman & Salvin, [1890]) – white-dotted cattleheart
Parides ascanius (Cramer, [1775]) – Fluminense swallowtail
Parides bunichus (Hübner, [1821])
Parides gundlachianus (C. & R. Felder, 1864) – Cuban cattleheart
Parides montezuma (Westwood, 1842) – Montezuma's cattleheart
Parides phalaecus (Hewitson, 1869)
Parides photinus (Doubleday, 1844) 
Parides proneus (Hübner, [1831])

References

Further reading

External links

Butterflycorner

photinus
Butterflies of Central America
Butterflies of North America
Butterflies described in 1844